Steppin' Out is a 1925 American silent comedy film directed by Frank R. Strayer from a screenplay by Bernard Vorhaus. The film stars Dorothy Revier, Ford Sterling, and Robert Agnew, and was released by Columbia Pictures on October 15, 1925.

Cast list
 Dorothy Revier as Daisy Moran
 Ford Sterling as John Durant
 Robert Agnew as Henry Brodman, Jr.
Cissy Fitzgerald as Mrs. John Durant
 Ethel Wales as Mrs. Henry Brodman
 Tom Ricketts as Henry Brodman
 Harry Lorraine as Sergeant

References

External links
 
 
 
 Lobby card at gettyimages.com

Columbia Pictures films
Films directed by Frank R. Strayer
American silent feature films
1925 comedy films
1925 films
Silent American comedy films
American black-and-white films
1920s English-language films
1920s American films